"Where You Are" is a song by American recording artist Jessica Simpson from her debut studio album Sweet Kisses. The single was released after strong commercial interest in her first single "I Wanna Love You Forever". Written by Louis Biancaniello, Sam Watters, A. Stamatopoulou, Nick Lachey and produced by Louis Biancaniello, Sam Watters, the song (which is a collaboration with Nick Lachey) was released as Simpson's second single on February 21, 2000, by Columbia. The song reached number 62 on the US Billboard, becoming Simpson's third Hot 100 chart entry. The single is most known for being the first single that Simpson professionally recorded with Lachey. (The couple recorded several other duets, including, "A Whole New World" and "Baby, It's Cold Outside".)

Background
Simpson developed and nurtured her talent in her local Baptist church, where her father worked as the congregation's youth minister. At age twelve, she unsuccessfully auditioned for The Mickey Mouse Club. While attending a church camp, at the age of 13, Simpson sang Whitney Houston's "I Will Always Love You" and an arrangement of "Amazing Grace". One of the camp's visitors was launching a Gospel music record label and saw great promise and profits in her voice. While attending J. J. Pearce High School, Simpson signed to Proclaim Records, a minor Gospel music record label. She recorded an album, Jessica, but Proclaim went bankrupt and the album was never released except for a small pressing funded by her grandmother. This small pressing gained her minor attention which led her to performing at concerts with other gospel legendary acts such as Kirk Franklin, God's Property, and CeCe Winans. When she was sixteen years old, Columbia Records executive Tommy Mottola heard Jessica, he was impressed with Simpson’s musical talent and skill. Mottola instantly thought Simpson sounded like Mariah Carey. Simpson was immediately signed to the label. She dropped out of high school but later earned her GED.

Due to the mainstream success of teen pop artist Britney Spears and Christina Aguilera, the label felt Simpson's debut album would perform just as well as, if not better than, Spears' and Aguilera's. Simpson immediately began working with producers such as Louis Biancaniello, Robbie Nevil, Evan Rogers and Cory Rooney. Biancaniello worked with Simpson on three of the album's eleven tracks, including "I Wanna Love You Forever", "Where You Are", and "Heart of Innocence". Simpson also met up with her then-boyfriend Nick Lachey, who already had a growing fanbase due to his work with boy-band 98 Degrees. Together, the couple recorded a duet, titled "Where You Are".

Writing and production 
"Where You Are" was written by Sam Watters and Louis Biancaniello (the two also produced the album) with the help of A. Stamatopoulou. "Where You Are" is a classic pop ballad that talks about love, similar to other songs of the era in which it was released as a single, as "Walk Me Home" by Mandy Moore and "I Turn to You" by Christina Aguilera. It was composed in the key of G major and has a tempo of 76 beats per minute. Simpson's vocal range extends from F3 to D5. The lyrics of "Where You Are" is constructed in verse–chorus form and is centered on the first love. "Where You Are" is a sweet, graceful melancholy ballad built mainly based on a piano melody.

Chart performance
"Where You Are" failed to reach the top 50 on the US Billboard Hot 100, peaking at number 62. However, the song did become a relative Adult Contemporary hit. The song failed to chart on Hot Dance Music/Club Play chart but became a hit on the Hot Dance Music/Maxi-Singles Sales chart, reaching number four. Billboard magazine explained this contradiction by pointing out that the physical single included a previously unreleased remix of "I Wanna Love You Forever", which may have benefited sales. The single went on to sell around 100,000 copies within the United States alone. Internationally, the song was only released in Canada.

Music video
Directed by Kevin Bray, the video of "Where You Are" is relatively low key and features Lachey and Simpson singing to each other. Due to the song's dark nature, the film stock is graduated to align with pale tones that can be seen in the video. As the video is also from the Here on Earth soundtrack, the video features scenes from the film.

Awards

Teen Choice Awards

|-
| align="center" rowspan="2" | 2000 || rowspan="2" | Where You Are || Choice Breakout || 
|-
| Choice Love Song || 
|-

Track listings
US maxi-CD
 "Where You Are" (album version) – 4:32
 "Where You Are" (Lenny B's club mix) – 10:55
 "Where You Are" (Lenny B's dub mix) – 7:14
 "Where You Are" (Lenny B's Bonus Beats) – 2:30
 "I Wanna Love You Forever" (Soul Solution extended club vocal version) – 9:28

Charts

Weekly charts

Year-end charts

Release history

References

1990s ballads
1999 songs
2000 singles
Columbia Records singles
Jessica Simpson songs
Male–female vocal duets
Nick Lachey songs
Pop ballads
Songs written by Louis Biancaniello
Songs written by Mando (singer)
Songs written by Nick Lachey
Songs written by Sam Watters